The Girl and Her Trust is a 1912 American film directed by D. W. Griffith.

Plot
Grace is a telegraph operator at Hillville and a woman who is very popular with the men in town. She is most fond of Jack, her co-worker who attempts to steal a kiss, causing Grace to reject him. Grace gets informed that Train No. 7 will be bringing a payroll of two thousand dollars from a bank to be picked up at her office. Jack offers to let Grace have his pistol while he goes out to lunch. Grace refuses his offer, believing that there is no danger to be found in such a slow place.

Once the money is delivered, Jack offers Grace his pistol once more but is refused again. After Jack leaves, two railroad tramps who had hitched a ride on train No. 7 spot the bag of cash and attempt to break into the office and steal the money. They try to open the box that the money is in but it's locked so they come for Grace who has the key. Grace locks herself behind the inner door to the office.

Grace calls out for help via a telegraph message. Unfortunately the tramps take the strongbox with the money onto a handcar and take it away. Grace chases after them and jumps onto the handcar attempting to fight the two men. They overpower her, however, and take her hostage.  Jack is unhappily walking along the track after the rejection of his kiss, and sees them racing away on a railroad hand-car. He flags down a train and chases after them at full speed. they are finally caught and a grateful, forgiving Grace rewards Jack with a kiss.

Cast
Dorothy Bernard as Grace, the Telegraph Operator
Wilfred Lucas as Jack, Railroad Express Agent
Edwin August as Younger Tramp
Charles Gorman as Older Tramp
Robert Harron as Telegrapher's Compainon/Remote Station Worker
Walter Long as  Bashful Suitor
Charles Hill Mailes as Remote Telegraph Operator
Alfred Paget as Tramp
W. C. Robinson as Simple Suitor
Charles West as Telegrapher
Christy Cabenne as Baggage Handler
William A. Carroll as Engineer
Anthony O'Sullivan as Extra

References

External links

 The Girl and Her Trust on YouTube

1912 films
1912 drama films
1912 short films
American silent short films
Silent American drama films
American black-and-white films
Biograph Company films
Films directed by D. W. Griffith
Articles containing video clips
1910s American films